Péronne may refer to:

Places
 Péronne, Saône-et-Loire, France
 Péronne, Somme, France
 Château de Péronne
 Arrondissement of Péronne
 Canton of Péronne
 Péronne-en-Mélantois, France
 Péronnes-lez-Binche, Hainaut, Belgium

People
 Peronne Goguillon (died 1679), alleged French witch

See also
Siege of Péronne, 1870–1871
 Treaty of Péronne (disambiguation)